The 1995–96 Honduran Segunda División was the 29th season of the Honduran Segunda División.  Under the management of Miguel Escalante, Universidad won the tournament after finishing first in the final round (or Cuadrangular) and obtained promotion to the 1996–97 Honduran Liga Nacional.

Final round
Also known as Cuadrangular.

Standings

Tie breaker

References

Segunda
1995